A shoulder dolly, also known as moving straps, lifting straps, furniture moving straps, and similar names, is a lifting strap and harness used in transport and logistics which allows moving personnel to distribute the load more evenly on the shoulders and hips so that heavy lifts can be performed with less risk of back injury. They are often used in pairs by two people carrying an object between them, and are sometimes used by moving companies. In 2019, a shoulder dolly made by a British manufacturer was named as a finalist in Tomorrow’s Health & Safety Awards 2019, which is part of a digital magazine for the British health and safety industry.

A forearm forklift strap is a somewhat similar device, but places the weight on the forearm instead of shoulder and hips.

Mechanism 
Shoulder dollies can promote proper lifting techniques by encouraging the use of legs for lifting, thereby reducing the risk of injury and back strain. They also help utilizing the body's stronger muscle groups and gives better leverage. According to one source, the leg muscles are less prone to getting tweaked and injured compared to the back due to the additional weight during a lift.

Compared to wheeled moving 
Compared to a trolley, a lifting strap can make it easier to move objects past uneven surfaces such as steps and stairs. Shoulder dollies are sometimes also used together with a wheeled trolley to pass varied terrain where it is possible to take advantage of benefits from both transportation methods when suited.

Safety 
Shoulder dollies can be a safety hazard if used incorrectly. They should not be used by persons with physical limitations or injuries. Safety boots may be recommended.

Shoulder dollies are often made of straps with padding at the points of contact with the body, and should preferably be sewn together in the back so that the straps do not easily slip to the side and off the shoulders during lifting. The sling is often attached to the object being carried via a lifting hook.

See also 
 Hand truck

References

External links 
 Video demonstration of moving a washing machine through stairs with a shoulder dolly - YouTube

Tools
Moving and relocation